Fallstar is an American metalcore band from Portland, Oregon. Founded in 2007, the original lineup consisted of lead vocalist Chris Ratzlaff, guitarists Justin Raymond Haag and Jason Brown, bassist Bryan Ratzlaff, and drummer Cody Carrier.

Background
Fallstar is a Christian metal band from Portland, Oregon. Their members at their inception in 2007 were lead vocalist, Chris Ratzlaff, guitarists Justin Raymond Haag and Jason Brown, bass guitarist Bryan Ratzlaff, and drummer Cody Carrier. Their group is now four members three Ratzlaff's, Chris, Bryan, and Jeff, alongside, Morgan Weisz.

Music history
Fallstar released one extended play, Your Eyes Don't Lie, Independently in 2007 with, they later released it with non-profit organization Come&Live! in 2010. The following year, their first studio album, Reconciler. Refiner. Igniter., was released by Come&Live! in 2011.  After a national tour with Christian ministry XXXChurch.com, they signed with Facedown Records, who released their sophomore album Backdraft, in 2013, featuring guest vocals by Matty Mullins of Memphis May Fire.  After some minor dispute with Facedown, the band left the label, became unsigned, and after 2 years of off and on touring, went to crowd fund their latest record Future Golden Age through a Kickstarter campaign, releasing it on their own independent start up label, Rat Family Records, in 2015.

Members
Current
Chris Ratzlaff - Vocals (2007-present)
Bryan Ratzlaff - Guitar, (2015-present) Bass (2007-2015)
Cody Carrier - Bass (2018-present)
Morgan Weisz - Drums (2015-present)

Former
Justin Raymond Haag - Guitar (2007-2015)
Jason Brown - Guitar (2007-2015)
Jeff Ratzlaff - Bass (2013-2015)

Touring Members
Johnie Collins - Guitar (2011-2013, My Favorite Season)

Discography
Studio albums
 Reconciler. Refiner. Igniter. (March 29, 2011, Come&Live! Records)
 Backdraft (April 16, 2013, Facedown)
 Future Golden Age (December 8, 2015, Rat Family)
 Sunbreather (February 12, 2021, Facedown)
EPs
 Your Eyes Don't Lie (2007, Independent, 2010, Come&Live! Records)

References

External links
Official website

Facedown Records artists
Musical groups from Portland, Oregon
2007 establishments in Oregon
Musical groups established in 2007